.gc.ca is a privately held second-level domain in the .ca top-level domain. It is used by the Government of Canada and operated by Government Telecommunications and Informatics Services, which holds all third level domains under the .gc.ca banner.

In 2012, the government of Canada had launched a plan to move all federal government sites to a single domain, "canada.ca". However, much of the plan was abandoned in 2017, with only a handful of departments and agencies such as the Canada Revenue Agency relocating; most government sites will remain under their own domains for the foreseeable future.

In addition to many official government websites, a process has been implemented where many of the Canadian diplomatic mission locations also have gc.ca domains as well.  (i.e. the Canadian High Commission in Barbados has a forwarding service from "barbados.gc.ca", or similarly the Consulate-General in Boston as "boston.gc.ca".)

Government entities with a domain name under .gc.ca
 Prime Minister of Canada
 Auditor General of Canada
 Supreme Court of Canada
 Health Canada
 Royal Canadian Mounted Police
 Department of National Defence (Canada)
 Canadian Armed Forces—operates separate websites for army, navy and air force
 Department of Finance (Canada)
 Statistics Canada
 Transport Canada
 Department of Finance (Canada)
 Environment Canada
 Canadian Human Rights Tribunal
 Canadian Nuclear Safety Commission
 Canadian Radio-television and Telecommunications Commission
 Department of Justice (Canada)
 Criminal Intelligence Service Canada
 Canadian Security Intelligence Service
 Correctional Service of Canada
 Parole Board of Canada
 Fisheries and Oceans Canada
 Natural Resources Canada
 Canada Border Services Agency
 National Capital Commission
 Natural Resources Canada
 National Research Council of Canada
 National Energy Board
 Patented Medicine Prices Review Board
 Shared Services Canada
Canadian Institutes of Health Research
Canadian Police College
Canadian Forces College
Global Affairs Canada
Canada School of Public Service
Public Safety Canada
Infrastructure Canada
Office of the Veterans Ombudsman
National Capital Commission
Agriculture and Agri-Food Canada
Canada Agricultural Review Tribunal
Canada Development Investment Corporation
Canada Energy Regulator
Canada Industrial Relations Board
Canada Mortgage and Housing Corporation
Canada Research Chairs
Canadian Air Transport Security Authority
Canadian Coast Guard
Canadian Cultural Property Export Review Board
Canadian Grain Commission
Innovation, Science and Economic Development Canada
Canadian International Trade Tribunal
Canadian Northern Economic Development Agency
Canadian Space Agency
Trade Commissioner Service
Civilian Review and Complaints Commission for the Royal Canadian Mounted Police
Office of the Commissioner for Federal Judicial Affairs Canada
Office of the Commissioner of Lobbying of Canada
Office of the Commissioner of Official Languages
Communications Research Centre Canada
Competition Bureau Canada
Competition Tribunal
Office of the Conflict of Interest and Ethics Commissioner
Copyright Board of Canada
Office of the Correctional Investigator
Courts Administration Service
Defence Construction Canada
Environmental Protection Tribunal of Canada
Federal Court of Appeal
Federal Court
Federal Economic Development Agency for Southern Ontario
Office of the Federal Ombudsman for Victims of Crime
Parks Canada
Canadian Human Rights Tribunal
Indian Oil and Gas Canada
Information Commissioner of Canada
Judicial Compensation and Benefits Commission
Laurentian Pilotage Authority
Library and Archives Canada
National Battlefields Commission
National Security and Intelligence Review Agency
Natural Resources Canada
Pacific Pilotage Authority
Privacy Commissioner of Canada
Public Prosecution Service of Canada
Public Sector Integrity Commissioner
Public Servants Disclosure Protection Tribunal
Public Services and Procurement Canada
Social Sciences and Humanities Research Council
Office of the Superintendent of Financial Institutions
Tax Court of Canada
Transportation Appeal Tribunal of Canada
Western Economic Diversification Canada
Status of Women Canada

References

External links
 Government of Canada

 
Gc.ca
Second-level domains